Stephen Cobbinah Buor-Karikari is a Ghanaian politician and a member of the Third Parliament of the Fourth Republic who served for the Amansie West constituency in the Ashanti Region of Ghana.

Politics 
Buor-Karikari was a member of the 3rd parliament of the 4th republic of Ghana. He was elected during the 2000 Ghanaian general election representing the New Patriotic Party. He polled 28,657 votes representing 77.82%. He lost the seat in 2004 to Kofi Krah Mensah of (NPP).

Career 
Buor-Karikari is a former member of Parliament for the Amansie West constituency in the Ashanti region of Ghana. Prior to entering politics, he was a lecturer at the University of Cape Coast.

References 

Living people
New Patriotic Party politicians
Ghanaian MPs 2001–2005
21st-century Ghanaian politicians
People from Ashanti Region
Year of birth missing (living people)